Converse is a town in Richland Township, Grant County and Jackson Township, Miami County, in the U.S. state of Indiana. The population was 1,265 at the 2010 census.

History
Converse was originally called Xenia, and under the latter name was laid out in 1849. J. N. Converse platted an addition in 1867.

The Converse Depot and Converse-Jackson Township Public Library are listed on the National Register of Historic Places.

Geography
Converse is located at  (40.579654, -85.869022).

Demographics

2010 census
As of the census of 2010, there were 1,265 people, 489 households, and 337 families living in the town. The racial makeup of the town was 97.5% White, 0.1% African American, 0.2% Native American, 0.1% Asian, 0.1% Pacific Islander, 1.1% from other races, and 0.9% from two or more races. Hispanic or Latino of any race were 4.2% of the population.

There were 489 households, of which 38.2% had children under the age of 18 living with them, 51.3% were married couples living together, 13.7% had a female householder with no husband present, 3.9% had a male householder with no wife present, and 31.1% were non-families. 27.2% of all households were made up of individuals, and 12.7% had someone living alone who was 65 years of age or older. The average household size was 2.59 and the average family size was 3.12.

The median age in the town was 36.9 years. 29.7% of residents were under the age of 18; 6.4% were between the ages of 18 and 24; 27.3% were from 25 to 44; 23.8% were from 45 to 64; and 12.8% were 65 years of age or older. The gender makeup of the town was 48.1% male and 51.9% female.

2000 census
As of the census of 2000, there were 1,137 people, 470 households, and 329 families living in the town. The racial makeup of the town was 97.71% White, 0.18% African American, 0.35% Native American, 0.18% Asian, 0.79% from other races, and 0.79% from two or more races. Hispanic or Latino of any race were 2.99% of the population.

There were 470 households, out of which 33.0% had children under the age of 18 living with them, 56.0% were married couples living together, 11.1% had a female householder with no husband present, and 29.8% were non-families. 27.0% of all households were made up of individuals, and 13.8% had someone living alone who was 65 years of age or older. The average household size was 2.42 and the average family size was 2.91.

In the town, the population was spread out, with 26.0% under the age of 18, 6.8% from 18 to 24, 29.9% from 25 to 44, 22.6% from 45 to 64, and 14.7% who were 65 years of age or older. The median age was 37 years. For every 100 females, there were 97.4 males. For every 100 females age 18 and over, there were 90.7 males.

The median income for a household in the town was $33,333, and the median income for a family was $42,813. Males had a median income of $35,938 versus $25,441 for females. The per capita income for the town was $16,317. About 12.6% of families and 15.7% of the population were below the poverty line, including 25.6% of those under age 18 and 6.8% of those age 65 or over.

Education
Oak Hill United School Corporation operates Oak Hill High School at Converse.

The town has a lending library, the Converse-Jackson Township Public Library.

Notable persons
 Monte Towe, Denver Nuggets basketball player

References

External links
 Town website

Towns in Grant County, Indiana
Towns in Miami County, Indiana
Towns in Indiana